Crambus humidellus is a moth in the family Crambidae. It was described by Zeller in 1877. It is found in China (Manchuria), Russia (Ussuri, Amur, Sakhalin), Korea and Japan.

The wingspan is about 11 mm.

References

Crambini
Moths described in 1877
Moths of Asia